Anastasia Sergeyevna Tikhonova (born 21 January 2001) is a Russian tennis player. Tikhonova has career-high WTA rankings of 167 in singles and 163 in doubles. She has won four singles and nine doubles titles on the ITF Circuit.

Career
Tikhonova made her main-draw debut on WTA Tour at the 2019 Baltic Open, having been handed a wildcard for the doubles competition, partnering Veronika Pepelyaeva.

Her singles WTA Tour debut came at the 2022 Rosmalen Championships.

Grand Slam singles performance timeline

ITF Circuit finals

Singles: 7 (4 titles, 3 runner–ups)

Doubles: 20 (10 titles, 10 runner–ups)

Junior Grand Slam tournament finals

Girls' doubles: 1 (runner–up)

Notes

References

External links
 
 
 

2001 births
Living people
Russian female tennis players
Tennis players from Moscow